Raymond Victoria (born 10 October 1972) is a former professional footballer who played as a midfielder.

Career
Victoria was born in Utrecht. He played for Feyenoord, De Graafschap, Willem II and ADO Den Haag in the Netherlands. After making more than 200 appearances in seven seasons with Willem II, and helping the club reach the 2004–05 KNVB Cup final, Victoria signed for Cypriot side AEK Larnaca in June 2006.

References

External links

1972 births
Living people
Dutch Antillean footballers
Dutch footballers
Footballers from Utrecht (city)
Association football midfielders
Netherlands Antilles international footballers
AEK Larnaca FC players
FC Bayern Munich footballers
FC Bayern Munich II players
Feyenoord players
De Graafschap players
Willem II (football club) players
Eredivisie players
Eerste Divisie players
Cypriot First Division players
Dutch Antillean expatriate footballers
Expatriate footballers in Cyprus